Anorthodes is a genus of moths of the family Noctuidae.

Species
 Anorthodes indigena (Barnes & Benjamin, 1925)
 Anorthodes triquetra (Grote, 1883)

Former species
 Anorthodes tarda is now Athetis tarda (Guenée, 1852)

References
 Anorthodes at Markku Savela's Lepidoptera and Some Other Life Forms
 Natural History Museum Lepidoptera genus database

Acronictinae
Noctuoidea genera